HardBall 6, also known as HardBall 99 for the PlayStation version, is a baseball video game developed by MindSpan and published by Accolade for Microsoft Windows and PlayStation in 1998. A 2000 Edition was released for Windows only in 1999.

Development 
Unlike the previous games in the series, the game was developed in two years instead of one, to allow ample time for a new three-dimensional video game engine. Unlike its predecessors, the game was licensed by Major League Baseball in addition to the Major League Players Association license, so that not only the players but also the teams are represented by their real names. New features of the game include a multi-season mode and amateur player drafting. HardBall 6 was the first baseball game to support MPlayer.com, an online multiplayer service. The game's voice commentator is Greg Papa, who replaced Al Michaels. The game's cover features San Diego Padres third baseman Ken Caminiti.

Reception

HardBall 6, its 2000 Edition, and HardBall 99 received "mixed" reviews according to the review aggregation website GameRankings.

References

External links
 
 

1998 video games
Baseball video games
HardBall!
Major League Baseball video games
North America-exclusive video games
PlayStation (console) games
Video games developed in the United States
Windows games